Nickelodeon Plus is a Greek free-to-air television channel in Thessaloniki. On 16 December 2011, its digital broadcast in Thessaloniki, Central Macedonia, entirely replaced the music channel Balkans TV, which began operating in November 1995.

On 18 October 2009, it was renamed MTV+ and by the end of 2011 was broadcasting the program MTV Greece. It belongs to Perth Broadcasting Enterprises Inc. which was established on 28 June 1993.

External links

Greek-language television stations
Television channels and stations established in 2011
Television channels in Greece